Javan Rene Torre Howell (born October 20, 1993) is an American soccer player who currently plays for Detroit City in the USL Championship.

Career

Youth and college 
Torre played four years of college soccer at the University of California, Los Angeles between 2012 and 2015.

While at college, Torre also appeared for USL League Two side Ventura County Fusion in both 2014 and 2015. He returned to the club in 2017 as well to make two appearances.

Professional 
On January 19, 2016, Torre was selected in the third round (56th overall) of the 2016 MLS SuperDraft by Colorado Rapids. However, he was not signed by the club.

Torre moved to Germany to play for Regionalliga Südwest side FSV Frankfurt during their 2017-18 season, making 24 appearances for the club.

On January 19, 2019, it was announced Torre had joined USL Championship side Las Vegas Lights ahead of their 2019 season.

On February 19, 2021, Torre joined NISA side Detroit City FC ahead of the 2021 season.

References

External links 
 
 UCLA Bruins profile
 

1993 births
Living people
American expatriate soccer players in Germany
American soccer players
Association football defenders
Colorado Rapids draft picks
Ventura County Fusion players
FSV Frankfurt players
Las Vegas Lights FC players
Detroit City FC players
Soccer players from Santa Monica, California
UCLA Bruins men's soccer players
USL Championship players
USL League Two players
National Independent Soccer Association players
American expatriate soccer players
United States men's under-20 international soccer players